Fernand Gregh (14 October 1873, Paris – 5 January 1960, Paris) was a French poet and literary critic. He was accepted in the Académie française in 1953. British composer Eva Ruth Spalding set some of his poems to music.

References

1873 births
1960 deaths
Writers from Paris
French people of Maltese descent
French poets
French literary critics
French male poets
French male non-fiction writers